Hokuyo Automatic Co., Ltd. is a global manufacturer of sensor and automation technology headquartered in Osaka, Japan. 

Hokuyo is known for its 2D and 3D scanning laser range finders for use in AGV, UAV, and mobile robot applications. The company also develops photoelectric switches, optical data transceivers, automatic counters, and automatic doors, primarily for use in factory and logistics automation.

References

Manufacturing companies based in Osaka
Manufacturing companies established in 1946
Robotics companies of Japan
Japanese brands